The Dana Glacier is located inside a northwest facing cirque located east of the 13,061 feet (3,981 m) Mount Dana on the eastern border of Yosemite National Park, California. It is very close to Tioga Pass and Highway 120. The glacier occupies the very steep, shaded western slope of the cirque at around 11,500 to 11,800 feet (3,500–3,600 m), although a part of it reaches up to 12,500 feet (3,800 m) (Dana Couloir). Repeat photography comparing images taken in 1883 with those from 2004 demonstrate that the glacier has retreated substantially in that period.

See also
List of glaciers in the United States

Cited references

Glaciers of California
Glaciers of Mono County, California
Glaciers of the Sierra Nevada (United States)